Hamilton Ventura da Conceicao (born 1983 in Cruz das Almas) is a Brazilian amateur boxer best known to win a silver medal at the 2006 South American Games in the men's light heavyweight division.

Career
He only started to box in 2006 but when his uncle, veteran Washington Silva was injured Ventura with a record of 24-0 was sent to the South American Games 2006 he beat Julio Castillo in the semi, in the final he was edged out 16:17 by Eleider Alvarez.

Silva was the Brazilian boxer at the 2007 PanAm Games but at the 2007 Brazilian Championships he became champion by winning every fight inside the distance.

He participated at the second Olympic qualifier at Heavyweight 201 lbs but lost the all-important final to Deivi Julio 0:5 and missed the qualification.

External links
2006
2007 Nationals
Article 

1983 births
Light-heavyweight boxers
Living people
Brazilian male boxers
South American Games silver medalists for Brazil
South American Games medalists in boxing
Competitors at the 2006 South American Games
21st-century Brazilian people